Tamara Davydovna Katsenelenbogen (Russian: Тамара Давыдовна Каценеленбоген; 1894−1976) was a Soviet constructivist architect and urban planner.

Biography
Tamara Davydovna Katsenelenbogen was born in Dvinsk, Vitebsk Governorate, Russian Empire (now Daugavpils, Latvia). Her brother, Nikolay Katzenellenbogen, was also a famous Jewish architect of the late 19th century. In 1911, Tamara Davydovna entered, and in 1916 graduated from the department of architecture of the Women's Polytechnic Institute - the first higher technical educational institution for women in the Russian Empire.

In 1923 she graduated from the Architecture Faculty of the St. Petersburg Academy of Arts. She designed and built a number of buildings in Leningrad and other cities of the Soviet Union.

Selected projects

Competition design of the Palace of Labor (1923).
Project development area TEZHE in the city of Kaluga (1930)
Project planning and development of the center of the city of Murmansk (1930)
Sanatorium " New Sochi " (1955)
Residential buildings on the street Smolyachkova, 14–16, St. Petersburg (with G.A. Simonov and V.A. Zhukovsky)
Baburin residential development, Lesnaya Avenue, St. Petersburg (with G.A. Simonov and V.A. Zhukovsky, 1927–1930)
Bateninsky residential development, Woodland Avenue, St. Petersburg (with G.A. Simonov, B. R. Rubanenko, P. Stepanov and V.A. Zhukovsky, 1927–1934)
Vyborg department store as part Batenenskogo residential development

References

External links
Каценеленбоген, Тамара Давыдовна
Katsenelenbogen on theСОВАРХ
Katsenelenbogen on Encyclopedia of the St-Petersburg (Энциклопедия Санкт-Петербурга)
Katsenelenbogen on the City of Sochi architecture (Архитектура Сочи)

Literature
 Berkovich, Gary. Reclaiming a History. Jewish Architects in Imperial Russia and the USSR. Volume 2. Soviet Avant-garde: 1917–1933. Weimar und Rostock: Grunberg Verlag. 2021. P. 58. 

1894 births
1976 deaths
Soviet avant-garde
Jewish architects
Soviet architects
Constructivist architects
Modernist architects
People from Daugavpils
Women architects